The 1966–67 season was Clydebank's first season after being elected to the Scottish Football League. They competed in the Scottish League Division Two, Scottish League Cup and Scottish Cup.

Results

Division 2

Final League table

Scottish League Cup

Group 9

Group 9 Final Table

Scottish Cup

References

 

Clydebank
Clydebank F.C. (1965) seasons